Vasum tubiferum is a species of large predatory sea snail, a marine gastropod mollusk within the family Turbinellidae.

Description
The length of the shell varies between 60 mm to 116 mm.

The shell resembles Vasum turbinellus (Linnaeus, 1758) but has five columellar plicae. The parietal wall is purple-brown. The smooth aperture is white within.

The shell is yellowish white and chestnut-black, stained and obscurely banded. The aperture is yellowish white. The border of the outer lip is black-spotted.

Distribution
This marine species occurs off the Philippines

References

 Michel, C. (1988). Marine molluscs of Mauritius. Editions de l'Ocean Indien. Stanley, Rose Hill. Mauritius

External links
 Anton, H. E. (1838). Verzeichniss der Conchylien welche sich in der Sammlung von Herrmann Eduard Anton befinden. Herausgegeben von dem Besitzer. Halle: Anton. xvi + 110 pp.
 Reeve, L. A. (1841-1842). Conchologia Systematica, or complete system of conchology; in which the Lepades and conchiferous Mollusca are described and classified according to their natural organization and habits. Longman, Brown, Green, & Longman's, London. Vol. 1: 1-195, pls 1-129; Vol. 2: 1-338, pls 130-300

tubiferum
Gastropods described in 1838